Limonium australe is a species of sea lavender known by the common name native sea lavender. It is native to Australia, where it is known to inhabit saltmarshes and mud flats along the eastern coast from northern Tasmania to Mackay in Queensland.

External links
Online Field Guide to Common Saltmarsh Plants of Queensland

australe
Flora of New South Wales
Flora of Queensland
Flora of Tasmania
Flora of Victoria (Australia)